Rhipidoglossum pareense is a species of orchid in the genus Rhipidoglossum that can be found in the South Pare Mountains and west Usambara Mountains of north-eastern Tanzania up to 1,500 meters in altitude. It can reach these altitudes due to the humid and foggy climate of the mountains it lives in. R. pareense is just a few centimeters tall and has small white flowers that grow from the plant. It was named after the Pare Mountains, where it was discovered.

The species belonged to a group of species thought to be part of the orchid genus Margelliantha and was noted by its dwarf habit, short stem, and inflorescence of few campanulate flowers.

Reference 

Plants described in 2022
Angraecinae
Orchids of Africa